Teofil Józef Wilski (16 October 1935 – 26 March 2022) was a Polish Roman Catholic prelate. He was titular bishop of Castellum in Mauretania and auxiliary bishop of Kalisz from 1995 to 2011.

References

1935 births
2022 deaths
People from Słupca County
20th-century Roman Catholic bishops in Poland
Polish Roman Catholic titular bishops